Fakhr Azam Wazir is a Pakistani politician, who served as a member of the Khyber Pakhtunkhwa Assembly from 2013 to 2018, belonging to the Pakistan Peoples Party Parliamentarians. He also served as member of different committees.

Political career
Fakhr was elected as the member of the Khyber Pakhtunkhwa Assembly on ticket of Pakistan Peoples Party Parliamentarians from PK-71 (Bannu-II) in 2013 Pakistani general election.

References

Living people
Pashtun people
Khyber Pakhtunkhwa MPAs 2013–2018
Pakistan People's Party politicians
People from Bannu District
Year of birth missing (living people)